Erik Frank (12 November 1899 – 5 January 1972) was a Finnish cyclist. He competed in two events at the 1924 Summer Olympics.

References

External links
 

1899 births
1972 deaths
Finnish male cyclists
Olympic cyclists of Finland
Cyclists at the 1924 Summer Olympics
People from Tuusula
Sportspeople from Uusimaa